Richard Bodkin was the mayor of Galway from 1610 to 1611.

Bodkin was sworn into office on 29 September 1610. As Galway was granted a new charter on 18 December by James II, Bodkin appears to have been the first mayor to have a sword borne before him. The sword is still property of Galway corporation. The title of bailiff, the mayor's two deputies, was changed to sheriff, the first two being Patrick Martyn and Christopher Bodkin.

See also

 Tomás Bobhdacing
 Thomas Bodkin
 John Bodkin fitz Richard
 John Bodkin fitz Dominick
 John Bodkin
 Dominick Dáll Bodkin
 Tribes of Galway
 Galway

References
 History of Galway, James Hardiman, Galway, 1820.
 Old Galway, Maureen Donovan O'Sullivan, 1942.
 Henry, William (2002). Role of Honour: The Mayors of Galway City 1485-2001. Galway: Galway City Council.  

Mayors of Galway
Politicians from County Galway
17th-century Irish businesspeople